Isle of Canes, a novel by Elizabeth Shown Mills, follows an African family from its importation and enslavement in 1735 through four generations of freedom in Creole Louisiana to its re-subjugation by Jim Crow at the close of the nineteenth century.  Mills explores the family's "struggle to find a place in [a] tightly defined world of black and white"  — a world made more complex by the larger struggle of Louisiana's native ancien regime to preserve its culture amid the Anglo-Protestant "invasion" that followed the Louisiana Purchase of 1803 and the resulting battle for political and social hegemony. Isle's central theme is the ambiguous lives of those who escaped colonial slavery only to find they could not survive as free without complicity in the slave regime.

The novel's subject-family is one that has been both romanticized and excoriated by journalists, academics, descendants, and current websites over the past half-century.  Isle's interpretation of their controversial role is based heavily on the author's original research across three decades in the archives of six nations, and actual documents are interspersed throughout the novel. The author's research began in 1972 when she was employed by a preservation society to document the history of one Isle landmark, Melrose Plantation.

Critical assessments of Isle of Canes focus on its upturning of stereotypes. Contemporary Lit describes the focus as "Gone with the Wind from a vastly different, more important perspective ... not that of the plantation owner or the poor white ... but homme de couleur libre and slave ... capturing the agonizing decisions which tore families and communities apart." Historical Novels Review similarly observes, "The Metoyers, a historical family both black and white and yet neither, challenge all perceptions of racial boundaries. You may never look at American History the same way again."

The Isle community is also the focus in Lalita Tademy's Oprah Book Club pick, Cane River.  Mills's Isle explores the colonial roots of the community and the experience of slaves who achieved freedom prior to the onset of Louisiana's Creole-Anglo conflict. Tademy's story, whose earliest slave generations are based upon research by Mills and her daughter, portrays the mid-nineteenth– and early-twentieth-century experiences of the community's slave families who envied, respected, and resented the free status of the Isle's Creoles de couleur libre—some of whose blood they shared.

A third, much older novel, Lyle Saxon's Children of Strangers, depicts the state of servitude into which the Islanders were subjected by the early twentieth-century. Saxon's era was one in which the chatelaine of the family's last remaining manor house (Melrose Plantation, a National Historic Landmark since 1976) was an Anglo patroness of the arts, who encouraged Saxon to visit and "observe" the community first hand. Saxon's portrayal captures the mindset of that era's white population, who vacillated between economic exploitation of the Islanders, sexual attraction to their women, and a paternalistic view of the multiracial Creoles as "simple people, but our people."

Historians struggle to understand the complexities of the Peculiar Institution—particularly the motivation that compelled a significant number of freed American slaves to purchase other humans once free to do so. Edward P. Jones lays out one psychological path in The Known World  creating a fictional anti-hero, the Black Virginian Henry Townsend, who is consumed by his self-centered ambition. Isle of Canes reconstructs the world of an actual family to define a radically different but equally uncomfortable trajectory by which more than a few ex-slaves survived a status many historians consider "neither slave nor free."

Major characters

Generation 1
François and Fanny, the African artisan and chieftain's daughter, captured into slavery and brought to the wilds of Louisiana in 1735. He accepted their fate and insisted that she accept it, too.

Generation 2
Coincoin ditte Marie Thérèse Metoyer, who swore over the dead bodies of her parents that one day their family would be free, rich, and proud. She kept her oath.<ref>Ken Ringle, "Up through Slavery: Marie Therese Coincoin," Washington Post, 12 May 2002 . This Washington Post feature article presents an historical overview of the family, drawing upon past research done by Isle of Canes'''s author and her husband/research partner.</ref>

Generation 3
Sieur Nicolas Augustin Metoyer, f.m.c., half-African and half-French, who hacked a cane brake from the wilderness then ruled over the Isle of Canes as patriarch of a legendary colony of creoles de couleur. They lived in pillared homes, yet toiled beside the 500 slaves who tilled their 18,000 acres (73 km²).

Generation 4
Perine (Mme. François Gassion) Metoyer Metoyer Dupré, who was born to riches but aged in shame. She never forgot the heritage of her family or the brutality that destroyed it. Through the persecutions of Louisiana's Creole-Anglo conflicts and Reconstruction-era Jim Crow, hers was a different vow: Never would she allow her family to forget who they were until they could reclaim their Isle. She, too, kept her promise.

References

Further reading

Mills, Elizabeth Shown. "Marie Thérèse Coincoin (1742–1816): Slave, Slave Owner, and Paradox," In Janet Allred and Judy Gentry, eds., Louisiana Women: Their Lives and Times (Athens, Ga.: University of Georgia Press).
Mills, Elizabeth Shown. "Isle of  Canes and Issues of Conscience: Master-Slave Sexual Dynamics and Slaveholding by Free People of Color", Between Two Worlds, The Southern Quarterly: A Journal of Arts in the South. 43 (Winter 2006): 158—75 . This essay posits the Isle community and other elite free people of color as defenders of the bridge between slavery and freedom, against the antebellum South's increasingly restrictive manumission laws and proposals to re-enslave the f.p.c. class.
Mills, E.S. "Quintanilla's Crusade, 1775–1783: 'Moral Reform' and Its Consequences on the Natchitoches Frontier", Louisiana History 42 (Summer 2001): 277–302. This essay explores the interrelationship of church and state in colonial Louisiana, which both tolerated and prosecuted miscegenation—including the prosecution of the central characters in Generation Two of Isle of Canes.
Mills, E.S. Natchitoches, 1729–1803: Catholic Church Registers of the French and Spanish Post of St. Jean Baptiste des Natchitoches in Louisiana. New Orleans: Polyanthos, 1977. Also: Natchitoches, 1800-1826: Register Number Five of the Catholic Church Parish of St. François des Natchitoches in Louisiana. New Orleans: Polyanthos, 1980. Also: Natchitoches Church Marriages, 1818–1850: Registers of St. François des Natchitoches, Louisiana. 1985; reprint, Bowie, Maryland: Heritage Books, 2004. This material, translated by Mills from original French, Spanish, and Latin registers now closed to public scrutiny, make accessible thousands of eighteenth- and nineteenth-century primary-source records of slave and f.p.c. baptisms, marriages, and burials from Louisiana's western frontier.
Mills, E.S. and Gary B. "Missionaries Compromised: Early Evangelization of Slaves and Free People of Color in North Louisiana." Cross, Crozier, and Crucible, Glenn R. Conrad, ed. Baton Rouge: Louisiana Historical Association and Archdiocese of New Orleans, 1993. Mills and Mills, at pp. 30–47, focus on the ambiguous religious climate of nineteenth-century Louisiana in which free people of color held some balance of power between competing Anglo and Creole cultures—the principal theme of Isle's Generation Three.
Mills, Gary B. The Forgotten People: Cane River's Creoles of Color. Baton Rouge: Louisiana State University Press, 1976. This early work provides a socio-economic overview of the Isle.
"The Louisiana Metoyers: Melrose's Story of Land and Slaves." American Visions,  June, 2000.. Written by the American Visions staff from Mills' and Mills' 1982 article, "Slaves and Masters," at n. 3 above.

External linksIsle of Canes'' 
 Louisiana Creole Heritage Center

See also

 Cane River
 Marie Thérèse Metoyer
 Melrose Plantation
 St. Augustine Parish (Isle Brevelle) Church

2004 American novels
History of slavery in Louisiana
Novels about American slavery
Novels set in Louisiana
Family saga novels
Colonial Louisiana